N,N-Dimethylaniline (DMA) is an organic chemical compound, a substituted derivative of aniline. It consists of a tertiary amine, featuring dimethylamino group attached to a phenyl group.  This oily liquid is colourless when pure, but commercial samples are often yellow.  It is an important precursor to dyes such as crystal violet.

Preparation and reactions
DMA was first reported in 1850 by the German chemist A. W. Hofmann, who prepared it by heating aniline and iodomethane:
C6H5NH2  +  2 CH3I   →   C6H5N(CH3)2 + 2 HI 
DMA is produced industrially by alkylation of aniline with methanol in the presence of an acid catalyst:
C6H5NH2  +  2 CH3OH  →  C6H5N(CH3)2  +  2 H2O
Similarly, it is also prepared using dimethyl ether as the methylating agent.

Dimethylaniline undergoes many of the reactions expected for an aniline, being weakly basic and reactive toward electrophiles. For example, it is nitrated to produce tetryl, a derivative with four nitro groups which was once used as explosive.  It is lithiated with butyllithium. Methylating agents attack the amine to give the quaternary ammonium salt:
C6H5N(CH3)2  +  (CH3O)2SO2  →  C6H5N(CH3)3CH3OSO3

Diethylaniline and dimethylaniline are both used as acid-absorbing bases.

Applications
DMA is a key precursor to commercially important triarylmethane dyes such as malachite green and crystal violet.  DMA serves as a promoter in the curing of polyester and vinyl ester resins.  DMA is also used as a precursor to other organic compounds. A study of the in vitro metabolism of N,N-dimethylaniline using guinea pig and rabbit preparations and GLC techniques has confirmed N-demethylation and N-oxidation as metabolic pathways, and has also established ring hydroxylation as a metabolic route.

References

Anilines
Dimethylamino compounds